Cynthia Joan White (born 1956) is a New Zealand applied linguistics academic.

Academic career

After an undergraduate at  Victoria University of Wellington, White earned her PhD entitled  'Metacognitive, cognitive, social and affective strategy use in foreign language learning: a comparative study'  from Massey University, while working there. She is also an adjunct faculty member at the University of New England in Australia.

Selected publications 
 White, Cynthia. Language learning in distance education. Ernst Klett Sprachen, 2003.
 White, Cynthia. "Expectations and emergent beliefs of self-instructed language learners." System 27, no. 4 (1999): 443–457.
 White, Cynthia. "Autonomy and strategy use in distance foreign language learning: Research findings." System 23, no. 2 (1995): 207–221.
 White, Cynthia. "Distance learning of foreign languages." Language Teaching 39, no. 4 (2006): 247–264.
 White, Cynthia. The Emergence of Christianity: Classical Traditions in Contemporary Perspective, Fortress Press, 2010, XVI, 220 p.

References

External links
 
 institutional homepage

Living people
New Zealand women academics
Academic staff of the Massey University
Massey University alumni
Victoria University of Wellington alumni
1956 births